Marie von Flotow (Nyborg, Denmark, 18 Augusti 1817 - 1909, Vitebsk, Russia) was a Russian Empire courtier, the lady's maid and influential favorite of the Russian empress Maria Feodorovna (Dagmar of Denmark).

Marie von Flotow was born in Denmark to the German nobleman Peter von Gerschau and Karoline Henriette Schmidt. She married Bernhard Friedrich von Flotow.

She served for a period in the household of Louise of Hesse-Kassel, before she was employed in the household of Louise's daughter Maria Feodorovna (Dagmar of Denmark), who married the future tsar Alexander III of Russia in 1866 and became empress in 1881.

Marie von Flotow was formally the lady's maid of the empress, with the responsibility of her jewels and wardrobe and the payment of her bills.  In addition to her formal position, however, she was also the favorite and confidante of Marie Feodorovna, which gave her a great deal of influence at the imperial court and gave her a position of "paramount influence". She kept this position also after Maria Feodorovna became a widow.

The influence of Marie von Flotow during the reign of tsar Nicholas II is described by Aleksandr Mosolov Methuen:

References

 Hall, Coryne, Little Mother of Russia: A Biography of Empress Marie Feodorovna, 
 Russian Court Memoirs, 1914-16, with some account of court, social and political life in Petrograd before and since the war
 Aleksandr Mosolov Methuen;   At the court of the last tsar: being the memoirs of A. A. Mossolov, head of the court chancellery, 1900-1916

Courtiers from the Russian Empire
Russian royal favourites
Danish courtiers
Maids
Domestic workers in the Russian Empire
German emigrants to the Russian Empire
German nobility
1817 births
1909 deaths